Southern Pacific Railroad's AC-8 class of cab forward steam locomotives was the fifth of SP's 4-8-8-2 classes.  They were built by Baldwin Locomotive Works in 1939.

The AC-8s were the first to receive the larger redesigned cab windows as standard equipment that were retrofitted onto earlier AC class locomotives.  The locomotives were only slightly larger than their AC-7 predecessors.

On November 19, 1941, No. 4193 caught on fire. It was carrying a freight train passing through Santa Susana Pass near Los Angeles. The train caught on fire because of a failure to shut off the oil feed. It was carrying 96 cars (not including its tender) and a caboose. A knuckle on the front end of the seventy-fifth car was broken when the accident occurred. Read more on the cab forward section. On May 3, 1941, No. 4199 suffered a boiler explosion at Cooper, California.

The first AC-8 entered service on August 18, 1939, and the last on November 26, 1939.  Number 4173 was first to be retired from active service on September 2, 1954, while 4172 was the last on January 9, 1958.  All of these locomotives were scrapped, beginning with 4155 on November 26, 1954, and ending with 4172 on April 24, 1959.

References 
 

AC-08
4-8-8-2 locomotives
Baldwin locomotives
Simple articulated locomotives
Railway locomotives introduced in 1939
Steam locomotives of the United States
Scrapped locomotives
Standard gauge locomotives of the United States
Freight locomotives 
Cab forward steam locomotives